The 1914 Campeonato Carioca was the ninth edition of the Rio de Janeiro state football championship. The competition was organized by the Liga Metropolitana de Sports Athleticos (LMSA). Flamengo finished the tournament with the most points and won their first state championship.

Participating teams

League table

Relegation playoff 
A relegation playoff match was scheduled between the bottom-placed team of the Campeonato Carioca (Paissandu) and the top-placed team of the Carioca 2nd division (Bangu). Paissandu refused to play the match, and Bangu was promoted to the 1915 Campeonato Carioca 1st division.

References 

Campeonato Carioca seasons
1914 in Brazilian football
1914 in Brazilian football leagues